Milagros Sequera Huss (born 30 September 1980) is a Venezuelan-Australian former professional tennis player.

Career
She joined the WTA Tour in 1999 and was ranked world No. 48 in July 2007. Her coach was Larry Willens. She was introduced to the game at the age of seven. Her favorite surface was hardcourt.

She won her first title in Fes, Morocco, in May 2007, defeating Aleksandra Wozniak in the final.

Sequera won the gold medal at the 2003 Pan American Games in Santo Domingo, Dominican Republic, winning the final against Sarah Taylor, and again in the 2007 Pan American Games in Rio de Janeiro, Brazil, winning the final against Mariana Duque Marino.

Sequera retired from professional tennis 2009.

Personal
Milagros currently resides in San Diego with her husband, Stephen Huss, whom she married in the Dandenong Ranges, near Melbourne, Australia, on 29 December 2009.

She was born on the same day as Martina Hingis. She also played team competition for the German tennis club TC RW Dinslaken for several years in the 1990s.

WTA career finals

Singles: 2 (1 title, 1 runner-up)

Doubles: 4 (3 titles, 1 runner-up)

ITF Circuit finals

Singles: 17 (11–6)

Doubles: 27 (18–9)

External links
 
 
 
 Profile on CBSSports

1980 births
Living people
People from San Felipe, Venezuela
Venezuelan female tennis players
Tennis players at the 2003 Pan American Games
Tennis players at the 2007 Pan American Games
Tennis players at the 2008 Summer Olympics
Olympic tennis players of Venezuela
Pan American Games gold medalists for Venezuela
Pan American Games medalists in tennis
Central American and Caribbean Games medalists in tennis
Central American and Caribbean Games gold medalists for Venezuela
Central American and Caribbean Games silver medalists for Venezuela
Tennis players at the 1999 Pan American Games
Medalists at the 2003 Pan American Games
Medalists at the 2007 Pan American Games